SiGNa chemistry is a type of chemistry in which alkali metals are encapsulated into porous oxides of silica gel in order to reduce their pyrophoric and highly combustible properties while preserving the desirable  reduction reactivity of the metals (Dye, et al.).  One can deconstruct the term "SiGNa" to derive Si (symbol for silicon), G (gel), and Na (symbol for sodium, a popular alkali metal).

SiGNa chemistry was pioneered by Michael Lefenfeld, a PhD student at Columbia University with the help of Dr. James Dye of Michigan State University.

References
Dye, James L., Kevin D. Cram, Stephanie A. Urbin, Mikhail Y. Redko, James E. Jackson, and Michael Lefenfeld. "Alkali Metals Plus Silica Gel: Powerful Reducing Agents and Convenient Hydrogen Sources." Journal of the American Chemical Society. July 2005; 127(26); 9338–9339.

External links
SiGNa Chemistry Company

Reducing agents